Northampton Old Northamptonian Chenecks F.C. are a football club based in Northampton, England.

History

On 12 July 1919 Edward Reynolds established the Old Northamptonians Association in memory of the 94 members of staff, sixth formers, and leavers of Northampton Grammar School who had lost their lives in the First World War. 

Reynolds wanted former pupils to maintain friendships and to continue playing sport, and he set up the club after a cricket match between recent leavers and the school first XI was played.

The football section was founded as Chenecks FC in 1946 under the guidance of well-known Coroner Sergeant of the Borough Police, George Lloyd. The club was formed to enable boys at the rugby playing Northampton Grammar School to play football. The club's unusual name is derived from the School Houses, Chipseys, Spencer, Beckett and St Crispins. 

The club became members of the Northampton Minor League playing at under 17 level, and when the boys were too old for youth football the club joined the Town League in 1950, playing at Abington Park. In 1960 the Old Northamptonians association invited the club to become one of their sports sections, thus Chenecks became ON Chenecks and relocated to the Billing Road sports ground.

They joined the United Counties Football League in 1969, and are still members of that league, in Division One. During that time, they have always been members of the lowest division of the league, which has successively been known as Division Three, Division Two and Division One. The club has twice won the Division One Championship (in 1977–78 and 1979–80), but their ground has not been sufficiently developed to enable them to take promotion to the Premier Division. The lack of facilities at their ground is also the reason they have not been able to participate in any F.A. national competitions.

Chenecks beat Tam O'Shanter from Coventry to win the 1985 Daventry Charity Cup final and in 1994 they were Northants Junior Cup runners-up, losing 1–0 to Vanaid.  In 1996 they lost 4–0 to Cogenhoe in the Daventry Charity Cup final having beaten Southern League Rothwell Town 1–0 away en route to the final.

In the 2009–10 season the club won its first major honor in the last twenty years under the guidance of Andy Marks when they picked up the Junior Cup with a 1 – 0 victory over local rivals Silbey at Nene Park. The 2010–11 season started with a change at the helm when rookie manager Graham Cottle accepted the vacant manager's position.

During 2014–15 season the club installed floodlights at the ground, the inclusion of other ground improvements (such as a turnstile) allowed them to compete in F.A. national competitions.

The 2015–16 season, under the continued management of Graham Cottle, Chenecks finished as runners up in the United Counties Division 1. As ground improvements (driven by the current Chairman Eddie Slinn) had been made during the season promotion was granted to the United Counties League Premier Division for the first time in the club's history. The promotion also meant that they were allowed to play in the FA Cup for the first time.

2017–18, after a 2nd stable season in the United Counties Premier Division Graham Cottle decided to end his 8-year reign at the club. finishing as one of the most successful managers at the club to date. His replacement for the new season has come from within the club as Eddie Slinn decided to promote reserve team manager Ben Foster into the role.

Honours
United Counties League Division One:
Winners (2): 1977–78, 1979–80
Runners-up: 1978–79, 2015–16
Daventry Charity Cup 
Winners (1): 1985
Runners-up: 1996
Northants Junior Cup
Winners (3): 2010, 2014, 2015
Runners-up: 1994
Premier Division Supplementary Cup
Runners-up: 2021

Records
Best FA Cup performance:
Pre-qualifying round, 2017–18
Best FA Vase performance:
First round, 2016–17

Former players
1. Players that have played/managed in the football league or any foreign equivalent to this level (i.e. fully professional league).
2. Players with full international caps.
3. Players that hold a club record or have captained the club.
Jim Hall  (Youth player)

References

External links

Football clubs in England
Sport in Northampton
United Counties League
1946 establishments in England
Association football clubs established in 1946
Football clubs in Northamptonshire